Pickens County School District is a school district in Pickens County, Alabama.

Statewide testing ranks the schools in Alabama. Those in the bottom six percent are listed as "failing." As of early 2018, Aliceville High School was included in this category.

References

External links
 

Education in Pickens County, Alabama